Captain Aníbal Arab Airport is an international airport serving the Acre River port city of Cobija, the capital of the Pando Department of Bolivia. This airport is located at a reasonably near distance to Monumento Pando, and is also at a relatively close proximity to Rio Acre.

The Cobija non-directional beacon (Ident: CIJ) is located on the field.

Airlines and destinations

See also
Transport in Bolivia
List of airports in Bolivia

References

External links
Cobija Airport at OpenStreetMap
Cobija Airport at OurAirports

Cobija Airport at FallingRain

Airports in Pando Department